Summerland is a census designated place (CDP) in Santa Barbara County, California. The population was 1,448 at the 2010 census, down from 1,545 at the 2000 census.

The town includes a school and a Presbyterian Church. There are many small businesses.

History
Tar from natural oil seeps in the Summerland area was used for sealing their ocean-going tomols by the Chumash people and for the Mission Santa Barbara as waterproofing for the roof.

In 1883, spiritualist and real estate speculator H.L. Williams founded the town of Summerland.  In 1888 he divided his land tract, on a moderately sloping hill facing the ocean, into numerous parcels.  He promoted the tiny lots – 25 x 60 – to fellow Spiritualists, who bought them in quantity and moved to the area.   The spiritual center of the town was a Spiritualist Church, with séance room, demolished when Highway 101 was put through in the 1950s.

In the 1890s, oil development began in the coastal area of Summerland, at the Summerland Oil Field.  Numerous wooden oil derricks were built on the beach, and on piers stretching into the ocean.  The world's first offshore oil well, drilled into the sea floor, was at this location.  Production at this beach area peaked before 1910, although most of the rigs remained into the 1920s.  Peak production from the onshore portion of the Summerland Field did not  occur until 1930; the last oil was pumped from the nearshore region in 1940.

In 1957, Standard Oil Co. of California (now Chevron) found the large Summerland Offshore Oil Field, several miles offshore, which was shut down in the 1990s. In January 1969, a blowout at the Dos Cuadras Field, about five miles offshore, caused the Santa Barbara Oil Spill, a formative event for the modern environmental movement.

In August 2015, Summerland's beach was closed for several days by County of Santa Barbara health officials due to large amounts of oil washed onshore. Local residents suspect the petroleum source is a leaking capped oil well ("the Becker wellhead") in the tidal area below Lookout Park.

Geography
Summerland is located at  (34.421395, -119.595969).  It is on the coast directly east at Ortega Ridge Road at the unincorporated community of Montecito and west-northwest of the city of Carpinteria.  Summerland has a significantly higher population density than the surrounding area.  U.S. Route 101 goes through Summerland.

According to the United States Census Bureau, Summerland has a total area of 2.0 square miles (5.2 km), of which, 2.0 square miles (5.1 km) of it is land and 0.33% is water.

The community is built on a set of coastal bluffs right next to the ocean. Surrounding it and Montecito are the cities of Carpinteria and Santa Barbara.

Climate
This region experiences warm (but not hot) and dry summers, with no average monthly temperatures above 71.6 °F.  According to the Köppen Climate Classification system, Summerland has a warm-summer Mediterranean climate, abbreviated "Csb" on climate maps.

Demographics

2010
At the 2010 census Summerland had a population of 1,448. The racial makeup of Summerland was 1,295 (89.4%) White, 3 (0.2%) African American, 7 (0.5%) Native American, 41 (2.8%) Asian, 6 (0.4%) Pacific Islander, 51 (3.5%) from other races, and 45 (3.1%) from two or more races. Hispanic or Latino of any race were 192 people (13.3%).

The whole population lived in households, no one lived in non-institutionalized group quarters and no one was institutionalized.

There were 687 households, 128 (18.6%) had children under the age of 18 living in them, 270 (39.3%) were opposite-sex married couples living together, 55 (8.0%) had a female householder with no husband present, 23 (3.3%) had a male householder with no wife present.  There were 54 (7.9%) unmarried opposite-sex partnerships, and 9 (1.3%) same-sex married couples or partnerships. 230 households (33.5%) were one person and 62 (9.0%) had someone living alone who was 65 or older. The average household size was 2.11.  There were 348 families (50.7% of households); the average family size was 2.68.

The age distribution was 211 people (14.6%) under the age of 18, 119 people (8.2%) aged 18 to 24, 315 people (21.8%) aged 25 to 44, 546 people (37.7%) aged 45 to 64, and 257 people (17.7%) who were 65 or older.  The median age was 49.2 years. For every 100 females, there were 92.0 males.  For every 100 females age 18 and over, there were 88.6 males.

There were 823 housing units at an average density of 413.7 per square mile, of the occupied units 362 (52.7%) were owner-occupied and 325 (47.3%) were rented. The homeowner vacancy rate was 3.2%; the rental vacancy rate was 9.7%.  790 people (54.6% of the population) lived in owner-occupied housing units and 658 people (45.4%) lived in rental housing units.

2000
At the 2000 census there were 1,545 people in 715 households, including 368 families, in the CDP. The racial makeup of the CDP was 91.78% White, 0.45% African American, 0.26% Native American, 2.39% Asian, 0.13% Pacific Islander, 2.27% from other races, and 2.72% from two or more races. Hispanic or Latino of any race were 7.44%.

Of the 715 households 17.9% had children under the age of 18 living with them, 42.2% were married couples living together, 7.4% had a female householder with no husband present, and 48.5% were non-families. 33.1% of households were one person and 5.5% were one person aged 65 or older.  The average household size was 2.16 and the average family size was 2.70.

The age distribution was 14.6% under the age of 18, 6.7% from 18 to 24, 34.2% from 25 to 44, 32.9% from 45 to 64, and 11.7% 65 or older.  The median age was 42 years. For every 100 females, there were 93.9 males.  For every 100 females age 18 and over, there were 91.9 males.

The median household income was $53,964 and the median family income was $75,625. Males had a median income of $50,469 versus $41,042 for females. The per capita income for the CDP was $41,668.  About 4.5% of families and 9.5% of the population were below the poverty line, including 7.5% of those under age 18 and none of those age 65 or over.

In popular culture
 Is mentioned in the Everclear song "Summerland", from their Sparkle and Fade album.
 Is the main location in the T.V. show Summerland.
 Is the title of a song by King's X on their album Gretchen Goes to Nebraska.  The song's lyrics do not otherwise specifically reference the town.
Is featured prominently in the climactic scenes of the science fiction film The Space Between Us.
Is the title of a song by indie pop/rock group half•alive.

Notable residents
 Julian Ritter, artist.
 Harry Thomason, film and television director and producer.

Notes

References
Rintoul, William, "Wood Derricks and Steel Men," Drilling Through Time, (Sacramento, California: California Department of Conservation, Division of Oil and Gas, 1990), pp. 13–15.
 Baker, Gayle.  Santa Barbara.  Harbor Town Histories, Santa Barbara.  2003.  
 California Oil and Gas Fields, Volumes I, II and III.  Vol. I (1998), Vol. II (1992), Vol. III (1982).  California Department of Conservation, Division of Oil, Gas, and Geothermal Resources.  1,472 pp.

 
Census-designated places in Santa Barbara County, California
Populated coastal places in California
Census-designated places in California